TV Moldova Internațional was the international second TV channel operated by the national public broadcaster, Teleradio-Moldova.

Launched the 10 January 2007, it takes back almost all the programs of the first Moldovan television channel Moldova 1, except some broadcasts for which the latter does not possess broadcasting rights outside of the Moldovan territory.

See also 
 Union of Journalists of Moldova
 Străşeni TV Mast

External links 
Official Site

Defunct television channels in Moldova
Television channels and stations established in 2007
Television channels and stations disestablished in 2013
2007 establishments in Moldova
2013 disestablishments in Moldova
International broadcasters
Teleradio-Moldova